Olympian Nights is a novel by John Kendrick Bangs published in 1902.

Plot summary
Olympian Nights is a novel in which an American tourist visits Olympus.

Reception
Dave Langford reviewed Olympian Nights for White Dwarf #82, and stated that "Dated fun, mostly, but there are good lines here and there."

Reviews
Review by Chris Morgan (1986) in Fantasy Review, October 1986
Review by Jon Wallace (1954 -) (1986) in Vector 135
Review by Don D'Ammassa (1986) in Science Fiction Chronicle, #87 December 1986

References

External Links
 Olympian Nights at Project Gutenberg

1902 novels